Karná is a village and municipality in Humenné District in the Prešov Region of north-east Slovakia.

History
In historical records the village was first mentioned in 1543.

Geography
The municipality lies at an altitude of 210 metres and covers an area of 10.215 km².
It has a population of about 450 people.

References

External links
 
 
 https://web.archive.org/web/20080111223415/http://www.statistics.sk/mosmis/eng/run.html 

Villages and municipalities in Humenné District
Zemplín (region)